Cadmium arsenide (Cd3As2) is an inorganic semimetal in the II-V family. It exhibits the Nernst effect.

Properties

Thermal 

Cd3As2 dissociates between 220 and 280 °C according to the reaction

2 Cd3As2(s) → 6 Cd(g) + As4(g)

An energy barrier was found for the nonstoichiometric vaporization of arsenic due to the irregularity of the partial pressures with temperature. The range of the energy gap is from 0.5 to 0.6 eV. Cd3As2 melts at 716 °C and changes phase at 615 °C/

Phase transition 

Pure cadmium arsenide undergoes several phase transitions at high temperatures, making phases labeled α (stable), α’, α”  (metastable),  and β. At 593° the polymorphic transition α → β occurs.

α-Cd3As2 ↔ α’-Cd3As2 occurs at ~500 K.
α’-Cd3As2 ↔ α’’-Cd3As2 occurs at ~742 K and is a regular first order phase transition with marked hysteresis loop.
α”-Cd3As2 ↔ β-Cd3As2 occurs at 868 K.

Single crystal x-ray diffraction was used to determine the lattice parameters of Cd3As2 between 23 and 700 °C. Transition α → α′ occurs slowly and therefore is most likely an intermediate phase. Transition α′ → α″ occurs much faster than α → α′ and has very small thermal hysteresis. This transition results in a change in the fourfold axis of the tetragonal cell, causing crystal twinning. The width of the loop is independent of the rate of heating although it becomes narrower after several temperature cycles.

Electronic 

The compound cadmium arsenide has a lower vapor pressure (0.8 atm) than both cadmium and arsenic separately. Cadmium arsenide does not decompose when it is vaporized and re-condensed. Carrier Concentration  in Cd3As2 are usually (1–4)×1018 electrons/cm3. Despite having high carrier concentrations, the electron mobilities are also very high (up to 10,000 cm2/(V·s) at room temperature).

In 2014 Cd3As2 was shown to be a semimetal material analogous to graphene that exists in a 3D form that should be much easier to shape into electronic devices. Three-dimensional (3D) topological Dirac semimetals (TDSs) are bulk analogues of graphene that also exhibit non-trivial topology in its electronic structure that shares similarities with topological insulators. Moreover, a TDS can potentially be driven into other exotic phases (such as Weyl semimetals, axion insulators and topological superconductors), Angle-resolved photoemission spectroscopy revealed a pair of 3D Dirac fermions in Cd3As2. In situ doping was used to tune its Fermi energy.

Conducting 

Cadmium arsenide is a II-V semiconductor showing degenerate n-type semiconductor intrinsic conductivity with a large mobility, low effective mass and highly non parabolic conduction band, or a Narrow-gap semiconductor. It displays an inverted band structure, and the optical energy gap, eg, is less than 0. When deposited by thermal evaporation (deposition), cadmium arsenide displayed the Schottky (thermionic emission) and Poole–Frenkel effect at high electric fields.

Magnetoresistance 

Cadmium Arsenide shows very strong quantum oscillations in resistance even at the relatively high temperature of 100K. This makes it useful for testing cryomagnetic systems as the presence of such a strong signal is a clear indicator of function.

Preparation 

Cadmium arsenide can be prepared as amorphous semiconductive glass. According to Hiscocks and Elliot, the preparation of cadmium arsenide was made from cadmium metal, which had a purity of 6 N from Kock-Light Laboratories Limited. Hoboken supplied β-arsenic with a purity of 99.999%. Stoichiometric proportions of the elements cadmium and arsenic were heated together. Separation was difficult and lengthy due to the ingots sticking to the silica and breaking. Liquid encapsulated Stockbarger growth was created. Crystals are pulled from volatile melts in liquid encapsulation. The melt is covered by a layer of inert liquid, usually B2O3, and an inert gas pressure greater than the equilibrium vapor pressure is applied. This eliminates the evaporation from the melt which allows seeding and pulling to occur through the B2O3 layer.

Crystal structure 

The unit cell of Cd3As2 is tetragonal. The arsenic ions are cubic close packed and the cadmium ions are tetrahedrally coordinated. The vacant tetrahedral sites provoked research by von Stackelberg and Paulus (1935), who determined the primary structure. Each arsenic ion is surrounded by cadmium ions at six of the eight corners of a distorted cube and the two vacant sites were at the diagonals.

The crystalline structure of cadmium arsenide is very similar to that of zinc phosphide (Zn3P2), zinc arsenide (Zn3As2) and cadmium phosphide (Cd3P2). These compounds of the Zn-Cd-P-As quaternary system exhibit full continuous solid-solution.

Nernst effect 

Cadmium arsenide is used in infrared detectors using the Nernst effect, and in thin-film dynamic pressure sensors. It can be also used to make magnetoresistors, and in photodetectors.

Cadmium arsenide can be used as a dopant for HgCdTe.

References

External links 

 National Pollutant Inventory – Cadmium and compounds

Arsenides
Cadmium compounds
II-V compounds